16 wit Dre is a 2006 Mix album by hyphy Bay Area rapper Mac Dre, who was killed 2 1/2 years prior to the album's release, mixed by DJ Backside.

Track listing
"DJ Backside"
"Home Wrecka"
"U.S. Open"
"U.G.A."
"Weekend"
"Fast Money" (featuring Warren G, Kokane & Dutches)
"Free Agents"
"P.I.M.P."
"Tizzle Drizzle"
"Extra Clip"
"Cutthoatish"
"Live Til' I Die"
"How You Feel"
"Crest"
"Say "Go""
"Game"
"A,B,C,P?"
"Thizz Music"
"Outta Range"
"Livin'"
"Yell It Out"
"Yo' Hood"
"Heat & Head"
"Mac Dre"
"Dope"
"Thizzlamic"
"Hubba Rock"
"Hip Hop Mega"
"Ask For"
"Game Go"
"Very Hot"
"Official Thizz DJ"
"Thizz Mountain"

Mac Dre remix albums
2006 remix albums
Thizz Entertainment remix albums
Remix albums published posthumously